El Indio is a census-designated place (CDP) in Maverick County, Texas, United States. The population was 263 at the 2000 census.

Geography
El Indio is located at  (28.514900, -100.311537).

Demographics

2020 census

As of the 2020 United States census, there were 182 people, 0 households, and 0 families residing in the CDP.

2000 census
As of the census of 2000, there were 263 people, 65 households, and 59 families residing in the CDP. The population density was 149.3 people per square mile (57.7/km2). There were 91 housing units at an average density of 51.7/sq mi (20.0/km2). The racial makeup of the CDP was 64.26% White, 1.90% Native American, 28.14% from other races, and 5.70% from two or more races. Hispanic or Latino of any race were 96.96% of the population.

There were 65 households, out of which 52.3% had children under the age of 18 living with them, 81.5% were married couples living together, 7.7% had a female householder with no husband present, and 9.2% were non-families. 7.7% of all households were made up of individuals, and 6.2% had someone living alone who was 65 years of age or older. The average household size was 4.05 and the average family size was 4.32.

In the CDP the population was spread out, with 39.5% under the age of 18, 11.0% from 18 to 24, 21.7% from 25 to 44, 19.0% from 45 to 64, and 8.7% who were 65 years of age or older. The median age was 25 years. For every 100 females there were 89.2 males. For every 100 females age 18 and over, there were 98.8 males.

The median income for a household in the CDP was $20,179, and the median income for a family was $20,179. Males had a median income of $26,250 versus $0 for females. The per capita income for the CDP was $5,462. About 25.5% of families and 35.8% of the population were below the poverty line, including 62.3% of those under the age of 18 and none of those 65 or over.

References

External links
 Handbook of Texas Online article

Census-designated places in Maverick County, Texas